Dodiongan Falls is a 20-metre (65.5 ft) high waterfall located in Barangay Bonbonon, 14 km away from Iligan City in Lanao del Norte province of the Philippines.

References

Waterfalls of the Philippines
Landforms of Lanao del Norte
Tourist attractions in Iligan

Lanao del Norte
Geography of Lanao del Norte